Guy (born c. 1012) was the duke of Sorrento from 1035, the brother of Guaimar IV of Salerno, father-in-law of William Iron Arm and William of the Principate, and brother-in-law of Humphrey of Hauteville. He was the son of Guaimar III and Gaitelgrima. Guy's place in history is secured primarily through his relations (by blood and marriage), though his own actions were not inconsequential. According to John Julius Norwich, he was a "selfless" prince, exhibiting a "moral sense rare for [his] time and position." 

His brother conquered Sorrento in 1035 and bestowed it on him as a duchy. He was a constant supporter of his brother and the Normans during the former's reign and he counted the mercenaries as allies when, upon the assassination of Guaimar, his family, including his nephew, the Salernitan heir, was rounded up by the assassins and imprisoned, he being the only one to escape. He quickly flew to the Normans of Melfi, whom he paid highly for aid. He brought them back with his own Sorrentine army to besiege Salerno, wherein the conspirators had fortified themselves. Guy had soon captured all of the conspirators' families and had negotiated the release of his nephew, Gisulf. Guy accepted their surrender soon after and promised them no harm. The Normans, not bound, they said, by Guy's oath, massacred the four brothers and 36 others, one for each stab wound found in Guaimar's body. Guy enthroned his nephew and he and his Normans, who would have preferred Guy as prince, did immediate homage to him. Nevertheless, Gisulf was thankless to his Norman vassals and grew to be a piratical neighbour to all in Southern Italy. His principality was constantly picked away and he ignored the advice of his uncle Guy counselling moderation. 

Guy remained forever loyal to the Hauteville leadership, however. In 1073, he captured the rebel Herman, his own nephew, and handed him over to Robert Guiscard, his nephew-in-law. Guy died amidst the breakup of the great principality his brother had forged and he had preserved. With his death, Sorrento became independent once more.

Issue
His children were:
 Guida, wife of William Iron Arm,
 Maria, wife of William of the Principate.

Notes and references

11th-century Lombard people
Lombard warriors